Paul Cherry is an American author, professional speaker, and business trainer, who writes and lectures internationally on sales effectiveness, customer-relationship management, and sales leadership. His book, Questions That Sell – The Powerful Process for Discovering What Your Customer Really Wants,  made it to BookAuthority's “Best Sales Books of All Time.” He lives in Wilmington, Delaware, outside of Philadelphia.

Cherry is the founder of a company which delivers B2B sales training and performance coaching to teams and managers in corporations across the US and Canada.. Cherry's sales presentation methods have been featured in publications such as Sales & Marketing Management and Selling Power. He has been acknowledged as one of the best proven sales leaders.

Cherry is a graduate of the University of Delaware where he holds a BA and MPA degree. He has been a member of the National Speakers Association and is a frequent keynote speaker and presenter at colleges, corporate events, business-to-business publishers and live education webinars.

Publications

Questions That Sell – The Powerful Process for Discovering What Your Customer Really Wants (AMACOM) was published in 2006. A second edition (HarperCollins Leadership) was released in 2017.

Questions That Get Results – Innovative Ideas Managers Can Use to Improve Their Teams’ Performance (Wiley) was published in November 2010 and coauthored by Patrick Connor. 

The Ultimate Sales Pro – What The Best Sales People Do Differently (HarperCollins Leadership) was published in August 2018.

References 

American business writers
American male bloggers
American bloggers
Living people
Year of birth missing (living people)
Writers from Wilmington, Delaware
Place of birth missing (living people)
21st-century American non-fiction writers